Albert Gordon "Bert, Spunk" Duncanson (October 2, 1911 – March 24, 2000) was a Canadian ice hockey player who competed in the 1932 Winter Olympics, winning a gold medal. He was the son of Duncan Duncanson and Elsie Back of Winnipeg, Manitoba.

Bert, Spunk was best known for his usage of Manitoba brand chewing tobacco during hockey games. This led to the 1974 ruling that banned all tobacco products from Canadian ice hockey games

External links
Albert Duncanson's profile at databaseOlympics
Albert Duncanson's profile at Sports Reference.com

1911 births
2000 deaths
Ice hockey people from Winnipeg
Canadian ice hockey right wingers
Ice hockey players at the 1932 Winter Olympics
Olympic gold medalists for Canada
Olympic ice hockey players of Canada
Winnipeg Hockey Club players
Olympic medalists in ice hockey
Elmwood Millionaires players
Medalists at the 1932 Winter Olympics